HD 175443 is a single star in the northern constellation of Lyra. This object has an orange hue and is dimly visible to the naked eye with an apparent visual magnitude of 5.64. It is located at a distance of approximately 418 light years based on parallax, and has an absolute magnitude of  0.42. The star is drifting further away with a radial velocity of +13 km/s.

This is an aging giant star with a stellar classification of K4III, having exhausted the supply of hydrogen at its core then cooled and expanded off the main sequence. It now has 22 times the girth of the Sun and is radiating 151 times the luminosity of the Sun at an effective temperature of 4,304 K. The metallicity, or abundance of elements with higher atomic numbers than helium, is lower than in the Sun, and it is spinning slowly with a projected rotational velocity of 1.0 km/s.

References

K-type giants
Lyra (constellation)
Durchmusterung objects
175443
092768
7132